Myosin-14 is a protein that in humans is encoded by the MYH14 gene.

This gene encodes a member of the myosin superfamily. Myosins are actin-dependent motor proteins with diverse functions, including regulation of cytokinesis, cell motility, and cell polarity. Mutations in this gene result in one form of autosomal dominant hearing impairment. Multiple transcript variants encoding different isoforms have been found for this gene.

References

Further reading

External links
  GeneReviews/NCBI/NIH/UW entry on Deafness and Hereditary Hearing Loss Overview